Tripospermum acerinum is a plant pathogen infecting mangoes.

References

External links 
 Index Fungorum
 USDA ARS Fungal Database

Fungal tree pathogens and diseases
Mango tree diseases
Capnodiaceae
Fungi described in 1918
Taxa named by Paul Sydow